Lucas "Kabamba" Floors (born 15 November 1980 in Oudtshoorn, Western Cape) is a former South African rugby union footballer, who made in excess of 200 appearances during his playing career. His usual position is on the flank, although he occasionally plays at number eight, and was once selected on the wing. Floors made a single appearance for the national team, the Springboks, in 2006 and played for the national rugby sevens team between 2003 and 2006, also captaining them in 2006.

Career

During the same year he was selected for the South African sevens team, where his efforts earned him the South African Sevens Player of the Season award in 2004. The 16 tries that he scored during his sevens career placed him third on the list of most points scored by South African sevens players to date, and second on the list for most tries.

In late November 2006 he was called up to the Springboks end-of-season touring squad to cover for injured players. He made his debut at flank on 25 November at Twickenham Stadium against England. The Springboks ended their seven-game losing streak against the English, winning the match 25–14.

Floors ended his 2006 season with the Players' Player of the Year title, and also received the Absa Currie Cup Player of the Year Award. He was named Man of the Match in the 2006 Currie Cup final which the Cheetahs won against the Blue Bulls.

In 2008 Floors was twice left out of the Cheetah's squad for disciplinary reasons, the second time for missing a team flight back to Bloemfontein. During the same year Cheetah's coach Naka Drotské selected Floors on the wing for the 13 September Currie Cup clash with the Sharks.

Floors' positional versatility as a loose forward was on display in the 2009 Currie Cup season when he starred as eighthman in the match against Boland.

Floors was contracted to play with the Cheetahs until the end of 2012. He then returned to the  where he captained the side in 2013.

He announced his retirement during the 2014 season, having made 207 first class appearances.

References

External links
 Cheetahs profile
 
 Kabamba Floors on sporting-heroes.net
 Kabamba Floors on SArugby.com

1980 births
Living people
People from Oudtshoorn
Cheetahs (rugby union) players
Free State Cheetahs players
SWD Eagles players
Rugby union flankers
South African rugby union players
South Africa international rugby union players
South Africa international rugby sevens players
Male rugby sevens players
Rugby union players from the Western Cape